Domingo Soler (born Domingo Díaz Pavia; 17 April 1901 – 13 June 1961) was a Mexican actor and occasional screenwriter of the Golden Age of Mexican cinema. He appeared in over 150 films and wrote the screenplays for 2 films.

Soler won an Ariel Award for Best Actor for his performance in the 1945 drama film The Shack, making him the first winner in that category.

Early life
Domingo Soler was born in Chilpancingo, Guerrero as Domingo Díaz Pavía on 17 April 1901 to Domingo Díaz García and Irene Pavía Soler. He was the younger brother of Fernando Soler and Andrés Soler, as well as the elder brother of Julián Soler and Mercedes Soler. His family is known as the Soler Dynasty.

Selected filmography
 Por mis pistolas (1938)
 The Whip (1939)
 The Count of Monte Cristo (1942)
 Simón Bolívar (1942)
 The Thief (1947)
 Lost (1950)
 La casa chica (1950)
 The Two Orphans (1950)
 We Maids (1951)
 The Three Elenas (1954)
 A Tailored Gentleman (1954)
 Tehuantepec (1954)
 Sube y baja (1959)
 His First Love (1960)
 My Mother Is Guilty (1960)

References

External links
 

1901 births
1961 deaths
Best Actor Ariel Award winners
Mexican male film actors
Mexican male screenwriters
People from Chilpancingo
Male actors from Guerrero
20th-century Mexican male actors
20th-century screenwriters